David Whitcombe (born 27 June 1954) is an English former professional darts player who won several major tournaments and reached two World Championship Finals between 1980 and 1992.

Biography
Whitcombe was twice a winner of the Winmau World Masters (1982 and 1985) and lost to Eric Bristow in the World Championship finals of 1984 and 1986. He also won the News of the World Darts Championship in 1989, the British Matchplay, the Swedish Open 3 times, the Finland Open, the Marlboro Masters and Dunlop Masters tournaments. He was also a prolific county and holiday camp open winner.

He played for and captained Kent in the inter counties league, winning the BDO (Darts World Magazine Sponsored) Tons Trophy and individual averages. In one season, he managed to win all 9 man of the match awards, beating 9 England International players in the process – something that has never been done before or since. 
He also played for Essex, Suffolk, and London. 
Whitcombe also represented England on numerous occasions, including the 4 man teams in the Europe and World cups. He also represented England v Rest of the World, and a Great Britain side which competed against the United States.

His overall World Championship record also included three quarter-final appearances in 1983, 1989, 1991 and the semi-finals in 1985. Bristow must be considered as Whitcombe's nemesis at the World Championship. In his 13 appearances at the championships, Whitcombe met Bristow six times and lost every time, including a quarter final in 1991 where Whitcombe lost 3–4 despite having been three sets and two legs up at one stage. However, in other Major championships like the British Matchplay and the World Masters, Whitcombe defeated Bristow in both the semi and finals. Whitcombe also defeated Phil Taylor in the first round of the 1988 British Professional, which was Taylor's first televised appearance, but lost in 2 finals, both to Jocky Wilson.

Whitcombe helped form the players' association WPDPA (World Professional Dart Players' Association) with John Lowe, Cliff Lazarenko, and Tony Brown. The association was set up with the intention of promoting more televised tournaments after the big slump of televised darts in 1989 and the early 1990s. Eventually this organisation linked up with the newly formed World Darts Council in 1992, and darts was soon split into two organisations.

Whitcombe never actually joined the PDC darts circuit at its outset – choosing instead to virtually retire from the sport in 1992. He made a comeback in 2004 – rejoining the PDPA and the PDC circuit. He managed to qualify for the 2006 PDC World Championship, losing to Roland Scholten in the first round. After that he failed to qualify for the 2007 World Championship and only competed at one PDC Pro Tour event during 2007 – the UK Open Southern Regional in March.

In May 2008, Whitcombe once again graced the big stage in a televised tournament, taking part in the BetFred League of Legends which was shown live on Setanta Sports, playing along with Bristow, Lowe, Lazarenko, Bobby George, Peter Evison, Keith Deller, and the eventual winner Bob Anderson. Whitcombe led the league after the first 4 weeks and was the standout player of the league at that time. Whitcombe's form slumped in the following league weeks, but he still looked on course to cruise into the semi finals as he was in second place after week 5 and in third place after week 6. However, on the final league night on week 7, due to his own loss to Deller and the match between Evison and Lazarenko ending in a draw, Whitcombe slumped to fifth and failed to reach the semi final stage.

Whitcombe failed to qualify for the 2010 Lakeside World Darts Championship and the 2009 Winmau World Masters.

Whitcombe did not take part in the 2022 World Seniors Darts Championship, despite several of his contemporaries doing so.

World Championship results

BDO
 1980: Second Round (lost to Bobby George 0–2)
 1981: Second Round (lost to Eric Bristow 0–2)
 1982: Second Round (lost to Steve Brennan 0–2)
 1983: Quarter Final (lost to Eric Bristow 3–4)
 1984: Final (lost to Eric Bristow 1–7)
 1985: Semi Final (lost to Eric Bristow 2–5)
 1986: Final (lost to Eric Bristow 0–6)
 1987: First Round (lost to Bob Sinnaeve 2–3)
 1988: First round (lost to Peter Evison 1–3)
 1989: Quarter Final (lost to Bob Anderson 3–4)
 1990: First Round (lost to Chris Whiting 2–3)
 1991: Quarter Finals (lost to Eric Bristow 3–4)
 1992: First Round (lost to Per Skau 1–3)

PDC
 2006: First Round (lost to Roland Scholten 1–3)

Career finals

Independent major finals: 2 (1 title, 1 runner-up)

Performance timeline

External links
An article about Dave Whitcombe's career and comeback
PDPA Interview with Whitcombe

English darts players
1954 births
Living people
Professional Darts Corporation associate players
British Darts Organisation players